Vistträsk (former name was Vistheden) is a locality situated in Älvsbyn Municipality, Norrbotten County, Sweden with 248 inhabitants in 2010.

References 

Populated places in Älvsbyn Municipality
Norrbotten